Riverside Academy is a Pre K–12 private school in Reserve, Louisiana in St. John the Baptist Parish, Louisiana. The school opened in 1970.

Athletics
Riverside Academy athletics competes in the LHSAA. The school had previously competed in the Louisiana Independent School Association (LISA). 

State Championships
Football championships
(1) LHSAA Football State Championship: 2016
(8) LISA Football State Championships: 1972, 1973, 1975, 1980, 1983, 1984, 1985, 1986 

Baseball championships
(1) LHSAA Baseball State Championship: 2017

Notable alumni
Jared Butler, NBA point guard
Rico Gathers, NFL tight end and former college basketball player at Baylor University

References

External links
 Riverside Academy website

Schools in St. John the Baptist Parish, Louisiana
Private K-12 schools in Louisiana
Educational institutions established in 1970
1970 establishments in Louisiana